The Story So Far is a greatest hits album released by Keith Urban in Australia in May 2012.

Background 
In October 2011, Keith Urban was announced as being a judge on the Australian version of  The Voice.
The series commenced in April 2012 and, to coincide with this, an Australian and New Zealand only greatest hits compilation titled The Story So Far was released. It features 19 tracks from the Grammy Award and ARIA Award winning artist's albums Get Closer, Defying Gravity, Love, Pain & the Whole Crazy Thing, Be Here and Golden Road.

It was released on 11 May 2012 and debuted at number one on the ARIA Charts and was the nineteenth biggest-selling album in Australia in 2012.

Track listing 
The Story So Far has 19 tracks.

Charts

Weekly charts

Year-end charts

Decade-end charts

Certifications

References 

Keith Urban albums
2012 greatest hits albums
Capitol Records compilation albums
Albums produced by Dann Huff